Roseburg North is a census-designated place (CDP) in Douglas County, Oregon, United States. The population was 5,912 at the 2010 census. Winchester, Oregon is included as part of Roseburg North.

Geography
The CDP includes land north of Roseburg city limits, but south of Umpqua Community College, including the settlement of Winchester.

Demographics

As of the census of 2000, there were 5,473 people, 2,341 households, and 1,556 families residing in the CDP. The population density was 240.4 people per square mile (92.8/km2). There were 2,491 housing units at an average density of 109.4/sq mi (42.3/km2). The racial makeup of the CDP was 93.97% White, 0.18% African American, 1.06% Native American, 0.75% Asian, 0.02% Pacific Islander, 1.21% from other races, and 2.81% from two or more races. Hispanic or Latino of any race were 3.07% of the population.

There were 2,341 households, out of which 25.3% had children under the age of 18 living with them, 54.1% were married couples living together, 9.0% had a female householder with no husband present, and 33.5% were non-families. 28.2% of all households were made up of individuals, and 14.4% had someone living alone who was 65 years of age or older. The average household size was 2.31 and the average family size was 2.79.

In the CDP, the population was spread out, with 21.1% under the age of 18, 7.9% from 18 to 24, 23.8% from 25 to 44, 26.7% from 45 to 64, and 20.4% who were 65 years of age or older. The median age was 43 years. For every 100 females, there were 93.5 males. For every 100 females age 18 and over, there were 90.9 males.

The median income for a household in the CDP was $35,684, and the median income for a family was $43,013. Males had a median income of $35,370 versus $21,953 for females. The per capita income for the CDP was $17,705. About 6.2% of families and 9.1% of the population were below the poverty line, including 8.7% of those under age 18 and 11.6% of those age 65 or over.

References

Census-designated places in Douglas County, Oregon
Census-designated places in Oregon